Nuella Njubigbo is a Nigerian actress, scriptwriter, model, and television personality. She joined the Nollywood family in 1999 and was nominated for the Rising Star Award category at the 2012 Nollywood Movies Awards.

Early life and education
Nuella Njubigbo was born on 18 March 1984 in Anambra State in the southeastern part of Nigeria. She completed her primary and secondary school education in Anambra State. She is a native of Anambra State. she studied government and public administration at Imo State University. She served in Delta State during her National Youth Service Corps program.

Personal life
On 29 March 2014, she married film director Tchidi Chikere in her family compound in Anambra State. Their union was the subject of the media for days mainly because the groom was previously married to another actress Sophia Chikere with three kids. Tchidi however gave reasons for the breakup of his previous marriage amidst public outcry. She has a baby girl from the marriage. On May 22, 2021, there were speculations that the marriage has ended as the couple unfollowed each other on Instagram. later on, Tchidi confirm the marriage actually ended and gave reasons.

She joined the Nollywood industry in 1999 with her first movie role in the film "Royal Destiny". She has acted in over 90 Nollywood movies. She has worked with prominent Nollywood stars like Ini Edo, Mercy Johnson, Desmond Elliot, Uche Jombo, Genevieve Nnaji, John Okafor, Pete Edochie, and Ken Erics.

She said in a chat with NollyNow that marriage and motherhood have taught the things she never knew before. She said "Marriage has made me a better person; more responsible and focused person. I don’t just do things again because I want to do them. Any decision I’m taking now I will ensure it benefits those around me. Marriage also has made me be more hard-working. If I were not married perhaps, I wouldn’t have been able to think of establishing my clothing line. I would have been jumping from one movie set to another. But now, I m thinking about the future of my children".

Filmography
Life's incidence
Lord of marriage 
Evil project 
Heart of a slave
Royal Grandmother 
Open & Close (2011)
Apparition
Royal Touch
Place war

Awards and recognitions
 Africa Magic Viewers Choice Awards
 City People Entertainment Awards
 Rising Star Award  2012.

References

21st-century Nigerian actresses
Actresses from Anambra State
Living people
Imo State University alumni
Nigerian film actresses
Africa Magic Viewers' Choice Awards winners
1984 births